Haruhisa Soda from the FiBest Limited, Tokyo, Japan was named Fellow of the Institute of Electrical and Electronics Engineers (IEEE) in 2015 for contributions to vertical-cavity surface-emitting and distributed-feedback lasers.

References

Fellow Members of the IEEE
Living people
Japanese electrical engineers
Year of birth missing (living people)
Place of birth missing (living people)